Euchlanis is a genus of rotifers belonging to the family Euchlanidae.

Sometimes alternatively referred to as wheel animalcules, rotifers feature a characteristic circular arrangement of cilia at their front ends that is reminiscent of a turning wheel when they are in motion. The genus has a cosmopolitan distribution.

Description 
Rotifers have a characteristic circular arrangement of cilia at their front ends. These cilia are used to bring food particles, including bacteria, debris and small protozoans, towards the mouth. A mastax, a jaw-like structure, grinds the food as it enters the stomach. Excretory structures known as flame cells create a current that drains them into the intestines or the bladder. They have transparent bodies and two strong structures that are used for swimming. They are sheathed in a glassy shell secreted by their outer skin.

Species 
The following species are accepted:
 Euchlanis alata Voronkov, 1912 
 Euchlanis arenosa Myers, 1936 
Euchlanis callimorpha Berzinš, 1957 
Euchlanis callysta Myers, 1930 
Euchlanis calpidia (Myers, 1930) 
Euchlanis contorta (Wulfert, 1939) 
Euchlanis dactyliseta Sudzuki, 1998 
Euchlanis dapidula Parise, 1966 
Euchlanis deflexa Gosse, 1851 
Euchlanis dilatata Ehrenberg, 1832 
Euchlanis hyphidactyla Parise, 1963 
Euchlanis incisa Carlin, 1939 
Euchlanis ligulata Kutikova & Vassiljeva, 1982 
Euchlanis lucksiana Hauer 
Euchlanis lyra Hudson, 1886 
Euchlanis mamorokaensis Berzinš, 1973 
Euchlanis meneta Myers, 1930 
Euchlanis mikropous Koch-Althaus, 1962 
Euchlanis oropha Gosse, 1887 
Euchlanis parameneta Berzinš, 1957 
Euchlanis perpusilla De Ridder, 1977 
Euchlanis phryne Myers, 1930 
Euchlanis pyriformis Gosse, 1851 
Euchlanis semicarinata Segers, 1993 
Euchlanis triquetra Ehrenberg, 1838

References

Rotifer genera
Ploima
Taxa named by Christian Gottfried Ehrenberg